Rywka Bajla Lipszyc (ʁivka lipʃitz) (15 September 1929 – 1945?) was a Polish-Jewish teenage girl who wrote a personal diary while in the Łódź Ghetto during the Holocaust in Poland. She survived deportation to Auschwitz-Birkenau concentration camp followed by a transfer to Gross-Rosen and forced labor at its subcamp in Christianstadt. She also survived a death march to Bergen-Belsen, and lived to see her liberation there in April 1945. Too ill to be evacuated, she was transferred to a hospital at Niendorf, where the record of her life ended.

Her diary, composed of 112 pages, was written between 3 October 1943 and 12 April 1944 in the Polish language. Translated to English by Malgorzata Markoff and annotated by Ewa Wiatr, it was published for the first time in the United States in early 2014, some 70 years after it was written.

Life

Rywka was the eldest of four children of Jakub (Yankel) Lipszyc and Sara Mariem (Sarah Miriam) née Zelewer. The family was imprisoned at the Nazi ghetto in Łódź following the German invasion of Poland. Her mother Sarah cared for the children alone after her husband and Rywka's father died on 2 June 1941, following a German beating in the street. Sarah herself died on 8 July 1942 of lung disease and malnutrition.

Rywka was deported to Auschwitz-Birkenau concentration camp in August 1944, along with her sister Cypora and three cousins: Estusia (Esther), Hanusia (Hannah), and Minia (Mina). Cypora was gassed upon arrival. Rywka was put to work with the women's commando. Ahead of the Soviet front, she was sent with her three cousins to Gross Rosen and imprisoned at Christianstadt in Krzystkowice, one of seven subcamps for female prisoners from Poland, Hungary, France, Holland and Belgium digging anti-tank fortifications. From there, she was evacuated again on a death march to Bergen-Belsen concentration camp, where she was liberated along with Esther and Mina on 15 April 1945, emaciated and sick.

In July 1945, Rywka Lipszyc was transferred from the new Bergen-Belsen emergency hospital for the displaced persons, via the transit camp in Lübeck, to a hospital in Niendorf, Germany, too ill to be evacuated any further.  The last document with her name on it found by the International Tracing Service was a DP Registration Record from 10 September 1945. No certificate of Rywka's death has been found, although according to Mina Boier's 1955 testimony (Minia from Rywka's Diary), that is where she died at age 16.

The diary
Rywka's diary was unearthed in the ruins of the crematoria at Auschwitz-Birkenau in June 1945 by a Red Army doctor, Zinaida Berezovskaya, who took it with her back to the Soviet Union. She died in 1983. The diary was kept by her son along with other war memorabilia. He died in 1992. Zinaida's granddaughter, on a family visit to Russia, spotted the manuscript and took it with her. Over a decade later in 2008 she contacted the local Holocaust Center in San Francisco. The diary was hidden from the world in relatively good condition before it was offered.

The last entry in the diary contains the following passages written in literary Polish; they were Rywka's final reflections on the beauty of the natural world in the time of sorrow: 

The diary, edited by Alexandra Zapruder, and accompanied by essays written by scholar Fred Rosenbaum and Rywka's cousin Hadassa Halamish, was published in English in early 2014 by the Jewish Family and Children's Services of San Francisco Holocaust Center in partnership with Lehrhaus Judaica house of learning in Berkeley, California, and is titled The Diary of Rywka Lipszyc. Rywka Bajla Lipszyc is not to be confused with Rywka Lipszyc recorded in the Database of Shoah Victims (1888–1940) who died in the Łódź Ghetto, wife of Yekhiel. The diary was gifted to the family by Dr. Berezovskaya's granddaughter in 2015. It is now stored in Yad Vashem in Jerusalem.

See also
The Diary of a Young Girl by Anne Frank

References

External links
 Stephanie Butnick, "Another Teenage Holocaust Diary Discovered", Tabletmag.com (March 18, 2014)
 Dan Pine, "The diary of another young girl: Holocaust journal comes to light in San Francisco", Jweekly.com (March 13, 2014)
 Michael Lieberman, "Anne Frank was not alone: Holocaust diary of 14-year-old Rywka Lipszyc finds the light", Book Patrol: A Haven for Book Culture, (March 18, 2014)

1929 births
1945 deaths
Łódź Ghetto inmates
Auschwitz concentration camp prisoners
Polish people who died in Bergen-Belsen concentration camp
Holocaust diarists
Women diarists
Polish diarists
20th-century women writers
20th-century Polish writers
Polish Jews who died in the Holocaust